Vishveshvara Bhatta, popularly known as Gaga Bhatt (from ) was a 17th-century Brahmin scholar from Varanasi, best known for presiding over the coronation of the Maratha king, Chatrapati Shivaji Maharaj.

Life and career

Early life and coronation 
Gaga Bhatt was renowned as Vedonarayana ("greatest exponent of Vedic discourse"). The Bhatta family was Deshastha Brahmin and originally hailed from Paithan, Maharashtra who belongs to Vishwamitra gotra.  His great grandfather Nārāyaņa Bhațța was a well-known scholar and his notable works on smriti include, Prayogaratna, Tristhalisetu and Antyeșțipaddhati. His grandfather was Rāmakŗșņa Bhațța, the eldest son of Nārāyaņa. His father Divākara Bhațța, the eldest son of Rāmakŗșņa was an author on smriti. His works include, Bhațțadinākara, Śāntisāra and Dinākaroddyota. His uncle, Kamalākara Bhațța, was also a noted scholar, mostly known for his Nirņayasindhu, a popular work on smriti. Gaga Bhatt himself is known for his Bhațțacintāmaņi, a work on Mīmāṃsā.

Gaga Bhatt's first reference appears in 1640 where is noted as a member of the assembly of Pandits in Kashi deciding upon the rights of a Shende Golak family. Gaga Bhatt has previously met Shivaji more than a decade before his coronation year of 1674. In 1663, he came to the Deccan. At Rajapur, Maharashtra Shivaji invited him to preside an assembly of 15 Pandits to decide on the rights of the Shenvi community and determine their 
status ie. whether they were Brahmins or Gowdas. The decision at this assembly in April 1664 is prefaced by praise or prashasti for Shahaji and Shivaji by Gaga Bhatt.

Coronation of Chatrapati Shivaji Maharaj
Gaga Bhatt appeared without invitation in the chronicles of Sabhasad and Chitragupta, when he decided to visit his court after hearing about the fame of Chatrapati Shivaji Maharaj. He was impressed with Chatrapati Shivaji Maharaj court and their treatment of him, quoting:

Gaga Bhatt presented a genealogy declaring that Shivaji's ancestors were Kshatriyas descended from the solar line of the Kshatriyas Ranas of Mewar. Shivaji had insisted on an Indrabhishek ritual, which had fallen into disuse since the 9th century. He was given the title Kshatriya Kulavantas Sinhasanadheeshwar Chhatrapati Shivaji Mahārāj by Gaga Bhatt. Shivaji's grandfather Maloji Bhonsle claimed descent from the Sisodia clan of Kshatriyas. According to this theory, Shivaji's original ancestors had migrated from Mewar to Deccan.Those Scholars who doubt Kshatriyas origin writes that Some local Brahmins doubted his Kshatriya  ancestry, but the prominent Pandit Gaga Bhatt of Varanasi presented a genealogy declaring that Shivaji's ancestors were Kshatriyas descended from the solar line of the  Kshatriyas Ranas of Mewar.Allison Busch, Professor at the Columbia University states that Shivaji was not a Kshatriya as required and hence had to postpone the coronation until 1674 and hired Gaga Bhatt to trace his ancestry back to the Sisodias. While the preparations for the coronations were in process, Bhushan, a poet, wrote a poem about this genealogy claimed by Bhatt in "Shivrajbhushan". Using this example, Busch shows how even poetry was an "important instrument of statecraft" at the time.

Scholars suggest that Pandit Gaga Bhatt was secured in charge of authoritatively declaring him a Kshatriya as Bhonsales being Marathas did not belong to Kshatriya nor any other upper caste but were mere tillers of soil as Shivaji's great-grandfather was remembered to have been. Bhatt was made compliant, and he accepted the Bhonsle pedigree as fabricated by the clever secretary Balaji Avji, and declared that Rajah was a Kshatriya, descended from the Maharanas of Udaipur. Bhatt was rewarded for the bogus genealogy with a huge fee. The Brahman acknowledgement of Kshatriyahood is therefore taken as political. The passage from the Dutch records suggest the plausibility of this argument. The report of Shivaji's coronation in the contemporary Dutch East India Company archives indicates that Shivaji's claim was contested twice at the ceremony itself. Firstly the Brahmins did not want to grant him the status of Kshatriya and then they refused him the recitation of the Vedas, indicating Shivaji was admitted to the fold of the higher varnas as far as the sign of the sacred thread was concerned, but restricted in their use of the concomitant ritual rights including the recitation of the Vedas.

Historians such as Surendra Nath Sen and V. K. Rajwade reject the Sisodia origin by citing the temple inscription of Math, dated to 1397 and holds the view that the genealogy was forged by Shivaji's men.
 
Gaga Bhatt officially presided over the ceremony, and had a gold vessel filled with the seven sacred waters of the rivers Yamuna, Sindhu, Ganga, Godavari, Krishna and Kaveri. He held the vessel over Shivaji's head and chanted the coronation mantras, as the water kept dripping from the several tiny holes in the vessel. After the ablution, Shivaji bowed before Jijamata and touched her feet. Nearly fifty thousand people gathered at Raigad for the ceremonies. Shivaji was bestowed with the sacred thread jaanva, with the Vedas and was bathed in an abhisheka. He had insisted on an Indrabhishek ritual, which had fallen into disuse since the 9th century. Shivaji then had the title of "shakakarta" conferred upon him. He was bestowed with the Zaanva (or Janeu, the sacred thread), with the Vedas and was bathed in an abhisheka. Shivaji was formally crowned Chhatrapati ("Chhatrapati= Chief, head or King of Kshatriyas", representing the protection he bestowed on his people) on 6 June 1674 at the Raigad fort.

References

External links 

 Indrabhishek

People of the Maratha Empire
Hindu revivalists
Hindu monks